Collier High School may refer to:

Barron G. Collier High School, Florida
Collier High School (New Jersey)